André Claude (born 18 August 1949) is a Canadian athlete. He competed in the men's javelin throw at the 1972 Summer Olympics.

References

1949 births
Living people
Athletes (track and field) at the 1972 Summer Olympics
Canadian male javelin throwers
Olympic track and field athletes of Canada
People from Lachine, Quebec
Athletes from Montreal